A symmetric, informationally complete, positive operator-valued measure (SIC-POVM) is a special case of a generalized measurement on a Hilbert space, used in the field of quantum mechanics. A measurement of the prescribed form satisfies certain defining qualities that makes it an interesting candidate for a "standard quantum measurement", utilized in the study of foundational quantum mechanics, most notably in QBism. Furthermore, it has been shown that applications exist in quantum state tomography and quantum cryptography, and a possible connection has been discovered with Hilbert's twelfth problem.

Definition
Due to the use of SIC-POVMs primarily in quantum mechanics, Dirac notation will be used throughout this article to represent elements in a Hilbert space.

A POVM over a -dimensional Hilbert space  is a set of  positive-semidefinite operators  that sum to the identity:

If a POVM consists of at least  operators which span the space of self-adjoint operators , it is said to be an informationally complete POVM (IC-POVM). IC-POVMs consisting of exactly  elements are called minimal. A set of  rank-1 projectors  which have equal pairwise Hilbert–Schmidt inner products,

defines a minimal IC-POVM with elements  called a SIC-POVM.

Properties

Symmetry
The condition that the projectors  defined above have equal pairwise inner products actually fixes the value of this constant. Recall that  and set . Then

implies that . Thus,

This property is what makes SIC-POVMs symmetric; with respect to the Hilbert–Schmidt inner product, any pair of elements is equivalent to any other pair.

Superoperator
In using the SIC-POVM elements, an interesting superoperator can be constructed, the likes of which map . This operator is most useful in considering the relation of SIC-POVMs with spherical t-designs. Consider the map

This operator acts on a SIC-POVM element in a way very similar to identity, in that

But since elements of a SIC-POVM can completely and uniquely determine any quantum state, this linear operator can be applied to the decomposition of any state, resulting in the ability to write the following:
 where 
From here, the left inverse can be calculated to be , and so with the knowledge that 
,
an expression for a state  can be created in terms of a quasi-probability distribution, as follows:

where  is the Dirac notation for the density operator viewed in the Hilbert space . This shows that the appropriate quasi-probability distribution (termed as such because it may yield negative results) representation of the state  is given by

Finding SIC sets

Simplest example
For  the equations that define the SIC-POVM can be solved by hand, yielding the vectors

which form the vertices of a regular tetrahedron in the Bloch sphere.

For higher dimensions this is not feasible, necessitating the use of a more sophisticated approach.

Group covariance

General group covariance
A SIC-POVM  is said to be group covariant if there exists a group  with a -dimensional unitary representation such that
 
 

The search for SIC-POVMs can be greatly simplified by exploiting the property of group covariance. Indeed, the problem is reduced to finding a normalized fiducial vector  such that 
.

The case of Zd × Zd 
So far, most SIC-POVM's have been found by considering group covariance under . Several operators must first be introduced.
 where  is a root of unity
and the shift operator as

Combining these two operators yields the Weyl operator  which generates the Heisenberg-Weyl group. This is a unitary operator since

It can be checked that the mapping  is a projective unitary representation. It also satisfies all of the properties for group covariance, and is useful for numerical calculation of SIC sets.

Zauner's conjecture
Given some of the useful properties of SIC-POVMs, it would be useful if it was positively known whether such sets could be constructed in a Hilbert space of arbitrary dimension. Originally proposed in the dissertation of Zauner, a conjecture about the existence of a fiducial vector for arbitrary dimensions was hypothesized.

More specifically,
For every dimension  there exists a SIC-POVM whose elements are the orbit of a positive rank-one operator  under the Weyl–Heisenberg group . What is more,  commutes with an element T of the Jacobi group . The action of T on  modulo the center has order three.

 
Then  such that the set  is a SIC-POVM.

Partial results
The proof for the existence of SIC-POVMs for arbitrary dimensions remains an open question, but is an ongoing field of research in the quantum information community.

Relation to spherical t-designs
Defining  as the t-fold tensor product of the Hilbert spaces, and
 
as the t-fold tensor product frame operator, it can be shown that a set of normalized vectors  with  forms a spherical t-design if and only if

It then immediately follows that every SIC-POVM is a 2-design, since

which is precisely the necessary value that satisfies the above theorem.

Relation to MUBs 
In a d-dimensional Hilbert space, two distinct bases  are said to be mutually unbiased if 
 
This seems similar in nature to the symmetric property of SIC-POVMs. Wootters points out that a complete set of  unbiased bases yields a geometric structure known as a finite projective plane, while a SIC-POVM (in any dimension that is a prime power) yields a finite affine plane, a type of structure whose definition is identical to that of a finite projective plane with the roles of points and lines exchanged. In this sense, the problems of SIC-POVMs and of mutually unbiased bases are dual to one another.

In dimension , the analogy can be taken further: a complete set of mutually unbiased bases can be directly constructed from a SIC-POVM. The 9 vectors of the SIC-POVM, together with the 12 vectors of the mutually unbiased bases, form a set that can be used in a Kochen–Specker proof. However, in 6-dimensional Hilbert space, a SIC-POVM is known, but no complete set of mutually unbiased bases has yet been discovered, and it is widely believed that no such set exists.

See also
 Measurement in quantum mechanics
 Mutually unbiased bases
 POVM
 QBism

Notes

References 

Quantum measurement
Unsolved problems in physics
Unsolved problems in mathematics
Hilbert space
Operator theory